Clanhugh Demesne is a townland in County Westmeath, Ireland.

Clanhugh Demesne is one of 15 townlands of the civil parish of Leny in the barony of Corkaree in the Province of Leinster. The neighbouring townlands are: Ballynafid to the east and Kilpatrick to the west.

In the 1911 census of Ireland there were 8 houses and 41 inhabitants in the townland.

Clonhugh House, built in 1867 for Colonel Fulke Greville, was constructed on the site of an earlier building, also called Clonhugh House, demolished to make way for the new structure.

References

External links
Clanhugh Demesne at the IreAtlas Townland Data Base
Clanhugh Demesne at Townlands.ie
 Clanhugh Demesne at Logainm.ie

Townlands of County Westmeath